Fieger is a surname. Notable people with the surname include:

Carl Fieger (1893–1960), German architect, designer, and teacher
Doug Fieger (1952–2010), American singer–songwriter and musician
Geoffrey Fieger (born 1950), American attorney

See also
Fiegert
Rieger